The Anchorage can refer to:

Locations
 The Anchorage, Tanera Mòr, Scotland – a sheltered bay 
 The Anchorage, Rhode Island, USA – former census area

Other uses
 The Anchorage, St George, Queensland, Australia – historic homestead 
 The Anchorage, Birmingham, England – an 'arts and crafts'-style house
 The Anchorage, Anchorage, Kentucky, USA 
 The Anchorage, Easton, Maryland, USA – historic home
 The Anchorage, Montclair, New Jersey, USA – historic home 
 The Anchorage, Marietta, Ohio, USA – historic home 
 The Anchorage, Beaufort, South Carolina, USA – historic home  
 The Anchorage, Charlottesville, Virginia, USA – historic home and farm complex
 The Anchorage, Kilmarnock, Virginia, USA – historic home
 The Anchorage, Washington, DC, USA – mixed commercial and residential building